Owen Wright may refer to:
 Owen Wright (rugby league)
 Owen Wright (surfer)
 Owen Wright (musician)